Área de negocios de Cuatro Torres (ANCA or CTBA), Spanish for "Four Towers Business Area", is a business district located in the Paseo de la Castellana in Madrid, Spain, on the former Ciudad Deportiva of Real Madrid. The area contains the four tallest skyscrapers in Spain, and four of the ten tallest in the European Union: the Torre Emperador, Torre de Cristal, Torre PwC and Torre Cepsa. Construction of the buildings finished in 2008. Now, a fifth tower, Caleido, has already finished in 2021.

CTBA buildings

Torre de Cristal

Designed by Cesar Pelli and built by Dragados, Torre de Cristal (Spanish for Crystal Tower), with a height of 249 meters, is the tallest building in the country. In April 2007, its structure surpassed the height of Torre Espacio.

Torre Cepsa

Designed by Lord Foster, and built by a joint venture of Dragados and Fomento de Construcciones y Contratas, the 45-storey Torre Cepsa (Spanish for Cepsa Tower), with a height of 248 m, is the second tallest building in the area, surpassed by Torre de Cristal by 1 meter.

It was first known as Torre Repsol and was to have served as headquarters for the oil and gas company Repsol YPF. During the construction of the tower, Repsol decided to change the location of its future headquarters, and the financial institution Caja Madrid (currently Bankia) purchased the building for €815 million in August 2007. In 2015 it was loaned to Cepsa for its main headquarters and hence the tower was renamed again as Torre Cepsa.

Torre PwC

It houses the five-star hotel Eurostars Madrid Tower, which occupies 60% of the tower, with rooms between floors 6 and 27 and at its upper part, a two-storey dining room offering a panoramic view of the city. It is the only tower with double skin facade and it is covered entirely of glass in the form of flakes. On the upper deck there are 3 wind turbines capable of producing wind energy for use in the building. A production of 25 kWh is estimated.

Torre Espacio

In November 2006, its height surpassed that of the Gran Hotel Bali, thus making it the tallest building in Spain, although it retained that title only for a short time (see above). The structure was topped out on March 19, 2007 and that evening, Alberto Ruiz Gallardón, mayor of Madrid, attended a firework display to commemorate the event.

Gallery

See also
AZCA
List of tallest buildings in Madrid

References

External links

PERI GmbH: Cuatro Torres Highrise, Madrid, Spain
Emporis buildings
Panoramics and night pics CTBA.

Buildings and structures in Fuencarral-El Pardo District, Madrid
Modernist architecture in Madrid